Monroe Center may refer to:

 Monroe Center, Illinois
 Monroe Center, Michigan
 Monroe Center, Wisconsin

See also
Monroe Center Historic District, a historic district in Monroe, Connecticut